Ysgol Uwchradd Aberteifi, translated as Cardigan Secondary School is a bilingual secondary school in Cardigan, Ceredigion, Wales. It offers secondary education from ages 11 to 18, incorporating GCSEs and A-Levels in its sixth form. The motto is Egni a Lwydd (Energy Succeeds).

The school is categorized as a 'Bilingual (Type C)'''  school by the Welsh Government, meaning that 50 - 79% of subjects, excluding Welsh and English, are taught through the medium of Welsh but are also taught through the medium of English. According to the latest Estyn report in 2022, 21.3% of pupils spoke Welsh at home.

There have been several allegations of bullying against the headteacher, Mrs Nicola James with staff going on strike both in 2018 and 2019. Following an investigation, no evidence of bullying against staff was found.

The school appeared on S4C's Hip neu Sgip?: Yn erbyn y cloc'' in 2011, as part of a garden makeover item which took place at the school in September 2010.

The school is referenced in the 2020 fiction book 'A Deadly Education' by Naomi Novik, (p.114) as attended by the protagonist Galadriel Higgins.

References

Secondary schools in Ceredigion